The Phoenix Convention Center is an events venue in downtown Phoenix, Arizona located along East Monroe, East Washington, East Jefferson, North Second, North Third, and North Fifth Streets. It opened in 1972 and hosts national and regional conventions and trade shows as well as consumer events and theatrical productions.  It consists of three buildings: the North and West Buildings are connected underground by a shared exhibit hall and by a skyway bridge over North Third Street, while the South Building is a stand-alone facility.  In addition, the "Third Street Canyon" between the North and West Buildings can be used as an outdoor event space.

History

The concept for a performing arts auditorium developed as early as 1959. At that time, cultural and theatrical events were being held in outdated high school auditoriums. It was determined that the Phoenix metropolitan area would benefit, not only from having an entertainment facility, but also from a facility that could accommodate regional and national convention business.

A citizens group was formed in the early 1960s to study the development of a convention center and the idea for Phoenix Civic Plaza became reality. In 1963, in order to finance construction, the non-profit Phoenix Civic Plaza Building Corporation was created. On April 15, 1969, the city of Phoenix and Phoenix Civic Plaza Building Corporation signed legal agreements for the initial construction of the convention center.

The Phoenix Civic Plaza Department was created in November 1969 to oversee the operational aspects of the construction, purchase equipment and hire and train staff. Construction of Phoenix Civic Plaza began July 8 of that same year and was completed in 1972 at a cost of $28 million and occupying . The original project included Phoenix Symphony Hall, which opened at the same time. The plans were drawn up by Charles Luckman Associates in a Brutalist style. Del E. Webb Corporation was awarded the construction contract to build the Civic Plaza. A formal dedication ceremony was held on September 28, 1972.

Six years later, the demand for additional space created a need for expansion. During that time, several conventions were bumped because of previous commitments and conflicting dates.

In the mid-1990s Phoenix Convention Center embarked on a $32 million renovation project to update and enhance its image and keep the facility competitive for convention and trade show business.

Recent expansion

A multi-phased $600 million expansion project has nearly tripled the size of the Phoenix Convention Center, making it one of the top 20 convention venues in North America.  Phase I opened in 2006, with Populous as the design architect and Leo A. Daly as the prime and managing architect.  Populous served as both design architect and architect of record for Phase II of the expansion, which saw the demolition of the 1972 structure and erection of a new structure in its place. It was completed in 2008.

The design of the  new  convention  center aims to reference the unique Arizona landscape.  Steel canopies extend over third Street to create shade. The large glass and stone atrium in the West Building  represents the  unique  angles  and  light  of  an  Arizona  slot canyon.  Colors,  textures  and  finishes  capture  the  warm  hues  of  the  Sonoran Desert and the cool tones of an Arizona desert sky.

Facilities
The Convention Center consists of three buildings.  The North and West buildings are connected by a lower level  exhibit hall and a skyway bridge.  Between them, they have 81 meeting rooms and two large ballrooms.  The stand-alone South building has a  exhibit space, 18 meeting rooms, and a  ballroom.  Third Street between the North and West Buildings can be used as an  outdoor event space.

See also
 List of convention centers in the United States
 Downtown Phoenix

References

External links

 Official website
 Phoenix.gov
 Downtownphoenix.com

Buildings and structures in Phoenix, Arizona
Convention centers in Arizona
Tourist attractions in Phoenix, Arizona
1972 establishments in Arizona